The Daewoo Tosca is a mid-size car designed by Daewoo in South Korea and marketed by Chevrolet as the Chevrolet Epica and Chevrolet Tosca, while Holden marketed it as the Holden Epica. Codenamed V250, it replaces the Daewoo Magnus and its derivatives. The Chevrolet Epica was officially launched in Europe at the 2006 Geneva Motor Show. The Tosca is noteworthy in that it is available with transversely-mounted straight-six engines. Contrary to the preceding models (V100 Leganza and V200 Magnus), which were styled by Giugiaro, the V250 was designed entirely in-house.

Due to the Daewoo brand being renamed as Chevrolet for South Korea, the Daewoo Tosca ended production in early 2011 in South Korea. Production in China started in March 2007 and ended in 2014. Tosca was replaced by the Chevrolet Malibu which entered production in South Korea for the first time.

Name 
GM Daewoo's official press releases says that Tosca is an acronym for "Tomorrow Should Come Always". "Tosca" is also a popular opera by Giacomo Puccini. The "Chevrolet Epica" name was previously used on V200 Daewoo Magnus models sold in Canada, Latin America, China, Europe, Arabia and Micronesia. Since April 2007, the Tosca has been marketed as the Holden Epica for the Australian and New Zealand markets, replacing the Holden Vectra sourced from Opel in Germany. Holden dropped the Epica in 2011 due to weak sales. It is also manufactured and sold in Kazakhstan as Chevrolet Epica since June 2007. Models in Iceland are badged "Chevrolet Tosca".

Powertrains 

Daewoo's XK straight-six engines were designed by Porsche, and they are what distinguish the Tosca from other similar vehicles. The V250 is a front-wheel drive car and the engines are mounted transversely; this configuration requires the straight-six engine to be very compact and packed quite tight. The Tosca was launched with two versions of the straight-six of different displacements: the 2.5-litre, which was carried over from the Magnus, and a 2.0-litre, which replaces the Holden-sourced 2.0-litre D-TEC used in the previous model. Since 2006, a 1.8-litre version of the D-TEC engine model is also available in the South Korean market. This engine is coupled to either a five-speed manual or four-speed automatic transmission.

The engine, co-developed by GM Powertrain, GM Daewoo, and VM Motori, debuted in the Daewoo Winstorm, and was the first diesel engine used in a Daewoo car. In early 2008, Daewoo launched an updated version of Tosca with a new six-speed automatic transmission in South Korea. There are two versions of six-speed automatic transmission: GM 6T40 for the 2.0 and 2.5-litre petrol engines and GM 6T45 for the 2.0-litre diesel engine. At the same time, Daewoo also revised rear portion of the car, changing the rear combination lamp and rear bumper.

Powertrains 

()

Gallery
Pre-facelift styling

Post-facelift styling

References 

Tosca
Front-wheel-drive vehicles
Mid-size cars
Sedans
Cars introduced in 2006
Cars discontinued in 2014